Sea swallow may refer to:

 the common tern, Sterna hirundo, a seabird in the family Laridae
 Glaucus atlanticus, a pelagic aeolid nudibranch
 the original name of the Firefly (dinghy)

Animal common name disambiguation pages